Michel Ancel (born 29 March 1972) is a French video game designer. He is best known for creating the Rayman franchise and was the lead designer or director for several of the games, including Rayman Origins and its sequel Rayman Legends. He is also known for the critically acclaimed (if poorly selling) video game Beyond Good & Evil, as well as for King Kong, based on Peter Jackson's remake of King Kong, which sold well and was critically acclaimed. In 2017, he began work on Beyond Good and Evil 2, although he left the project in 2020.

Career
Ancel's first demo, Mechanic Warriors, was developed for software house Lankhor. Ancel joined Ubisoft as a graphic artist after meeting the game author Nicolas Choukroun in Montpellier at the age of 17. He made the graphics of Nicolas' games such as The Intruder, Pick'n Pile before doing his first game as both programmer and graphic artist Brain Blaster published by Ubisoft in 1990. In 1992, he began to work on Rayman, his directorial debut. It was released in 1995 for PlayStation, Atari Jaguar and Sega Saturn.

Ancel was heavily involved in the development of Rayman 2: The Great Escape, but had only an advisory role on Rayman 3: Hoodlum Havoc. Although he praised its development team, he claims he would have "made the game differently".

In 2003, he created Beyond Good & Evil, which garnered critical acclaim and a cult following, but was a commercial failure. However, film director Peter Jackson's admiration of the game — and his frustration with EA's handling of The Lord of the Rings license — led to Ancel being given direction of the King Kong video game adaptation. In spite of Ubisoft's reluctance to produce a sequel Beyond Good and Evil 2, Ancel has expressed a clear wish to produce one in the future., which was officially announced at Ubidays 2008 event on 28 May 2008. On 18 December 2008, at the VGL event in Paris.

On 5 April 2006, Ubisoft announced Ancel was leading the development of the fourth game in the Rayman series, Rayman Raving Rabbids, for Wii. The game began production in early 2005 and was released on 15 November 2006 for the launch of the Wii. However, Ancel was absent from the project after its E3 announcement, and he has made no public appearances regarding the game after the development team switched focus from a free-roaming platformer to the final minigames format shortly after E3. In the final game Ancel was credited with storyboarding and character design, while design credits were shared between other people.

In 2010, Ubisoft announced Rayman Origins, first an episodic video game designed by Michel Ancel and developed by a small team of five people, but it was announced that it transformed into a full game. The title uses the UbiArt Framework developed by Ubisoft Montpellier and Ancel. UbiArt is a developer platform that allows artists and animators to easily create content and use it in an interactive environment. The engine is optimized for high-definition resolutions and is capable of running games at 60 frames per second in 1920x1080 resolution. UBIart tools were supposed to be released as open-source software in 2011 but this did not happen.

In 2014, Ancel announced he had formed an independent games studio called Wild Sheep. He would continue to contribute to the development of projects at Ubisoft, including "an extremely ambitious new title that is very close to his and the team's heart." Wild Sheep are currently (2015) developing an open world pre-historic survival game called Wild.

Ancel announced he was leaving the games industry in September 2020 to spend time on a wildlife sanctuary. He stated that his two current projects, Beyond Good & Evil 2 and Wild, were in capable hands with his departure. One week after his departure, Libération published an article investigating allegations of Ancel's toxic leadership at Ubisoft. Ancel confirmed he was aware that he was being investigated but denied the accusations against him and called Libération'''s report about him "fake news".

Recognition

On 13 March 2006, he, along with Shigeru Miyamoto and Frédérick Raynal, were knighted by the French Minister of Culture and Communication, Renaud Donnedieu de Vabres, a knight of arts and literature. It was the first time that video game developers were honored with this distinction. Ancel is recognized as one of the best game designers in IGN's Top 100 Game Creators, ranking 24th out of 100.

Design philosophy
Ancel aims for a high degree of freedom in his games. He is critical of games that claim to offer freedom, but present limits or invisible boundaries where players do not expect them.

GamesThe Intruder (1989) - GraphicsBrain Blasters (also known as The Teller) (1990) – Programmer, Graphic artist, Music and SoundPick 'n Pile (1990) – Writer, GraphicsRayman (1995) – Lead Designer, Original ConceptTonic Trouble (1999) – Original ConceptRayman 2: The Great Escape (1999) – Original Concept, Based on a Story By, Artistic Director, Game DesignRayman 3: Hoodlum Havoc (2003) – Special Thanks To, Workers' AdvisorRayman M (2001) – Character designerBeyond Good & Evil (2003) – Director, Game Design, StoryPeter Jackson's King Kong (2005) – Creative Director, Game DesignRayman Raving Rabbids (2006) – Character designer, World Based ByRayman Raving Rabbids 2 (2007) – Character designerRayman Raving Rabbids: TV Party (2008) – Character designerRayman Origins (2011) - Director, ConceptThe Adventures of Tintin: The Secret of the Unicorn (2011) - Tintin First Project TeamRayman Jungle Run (2012) - Creative DirectorRayman Legends (2013) - Director, ConceptRayman Fiesta Run (2013) - Creative DirectorRayman Adventures (2015) - Director, ConceptPsychonauts 2 (2021) - Special ThanksBeyond Good and Evil 2 (TBA) – Director (formerly)Wild – Designer, Director (formerly)

Ancel worked on, but did not design, Tonic Trouble (1999), which features limbless characters similar to Rayman. He shares credit on his Rayman games with Frédéric Houde, while Jacques Exertier contributed many of the cinematic and story elements of Beyond Good & Evil and Peter Jackson's King Kong''.

References

External links
 
Michel Ancel profile at MobyGames

1972 births
French video game designers
Living people
French computer programmers
Ubisoft people